Anamol or Anmol is a name used in Nepal and India. Its meaning is "Precious".  It is a unisex name.

Film 
 Anmol, a 1993 Indian film
 Anmol Ghadi, a 1946 Hindi film
 Anmol Ratan, a 1950 Bollywood drama film
 Anmol Tasveer, a 1978 Bollywood film

People 
Notable people with Anamol as a given name are:
 Anmol K.C., Nepalese actor and producer
 Anmol Malik, playback singer and songwriter in the Indian Film Industry

Nepalese masculine given names
Indian given names